Nikolaus Paryla  (born 19 November 1939, in Zurich) is an Austrian actor and stage director.

Paryla studied acting at the Academy of Music and Performing Arts at the Max Reinhardt Seminar in Vienna. In 1961 he received his first engagement at the  Wiener Volkstheater as Moritz Stiefel in Frank Wedekind's Spring Awakening (Frühlings Erwachen), directed by Gustav Manker, after which he was engaged until 1969 at the Theater in der Josefstadt. Between 1970 and 1971 Paryla belonged to the ensemble of the Berlin Schiller Theater, after which he stood until 1986 on the stage of the Munich Residenz Theatre. 

Paryla won the Hersfeld-Preis in 1980.

Selected filmography
 1960: Das Zaubermännchen
 1979: 
 1979: Der ganz normale Wahnsinn (TV series)
 1982: The Confessions of Felix Krull (TV miniseries)
 1983: 
 1988:  (TV miniseries)
 1988: Mit Leib und Seele (TV series)
 1995: Ant Street
 1995: 
 1995:  (TV film)
 1997: The Castle (TV film)
 1998: 
 1999: Geliebte Gegner (TV film)
 2000: Polt muss weinen
 2001: Zwölfeläuten
 2001: Tatort –  (part of TV-series)
 2003: Pumuckl und sein Zirkusabenteuer (part of TV-series)
 2004: Schimanski: Das Geheimnis des Golem (part of TV-series)
 2005: Marias letzte Reise (TV film)
 2005: Schiller (TV film)
 2006:  (TV film)
 2008: Tatort –  (part of TV-series)
 2009: Tatort – Wir sind die Guten (part of TV-series)
 2010: Länger Leben
 2012:

References

External links

20th-century Austrian male actors
Austrian male stage actors
Austrian male television actors
1939 births
Living people
Male actors from Zürich
German Film Award winners